The  was a professional wrestling world heavyweight championship owned by the New Japan Pro-Wrestling (NJPW) promotion. The title was introduced on June 12, 1987, in the final of an IWGP tournament. It was unified with the IWGP Intercontinental Championship on March 4, 2021 to form the new IWGP World Heavyweight Championship.

The championship was represented by four different belts from 1987 to 2021. The fourth and last generation belt was introduced in March 2008. The title formed what was unofficially called the  along with the IWGP Intercontinental Championship and the NEVER Openweight Championship.

Title history
An early version of this championship was introduced in 1983 for the winner (Hulk Hogan) of the IWGP League 1983. Since then, the championship was defended annually against the winner of the IWGP League of the year. A new IWGP Heavyweight Championship arrived only in 1987, replacing the old version. The 1987 version was defended regularly and was the top championship of NJPW until the introduction of the IWGP World Heavyweight Championship in 2021.

Throughout the history of the championship, several wrestlers were forced to relinquish the title due to an inability to participate in title defenses. When a wrestler had been injured or unable to compete for other reasons, tournaments were held to determine the new champion.

In 2006, Brock Lesnar was stripped of the title for refusing to defend it, claiming he was owed money by NJPW. The company went on to crown a new champion, while Lesnar kept the physical belt. He signed with Antonio Inoki's Inoki Genome Federation (IGF) in 2007, and lost the championship to Kurt Angle on the promotion's inaugural event. Angle later lost the belt in a unification match to the NJPW-recognized champion Shinsuke Nakamura in 2008.

On January 5, 2020, Tetsuya Naito won the Heavyweight and Intercontinental Championships. Both titles kept their individual history, but were defended at the same time. Sometimes, they were called "Double Championship". One year after Naito's victory, Chairman Naoki Sugabayashi announced the unification of both titles, deactivating the Intercontinental title and forming the new IWGP World Heavyweight Championship. On March 4, 2021, the Double Champion Kota Ibushi defeated El Desperado to unify and retire both titles.

On October 21, 2021, after winning the G1 Climax, winner Kazuchika Okada asked for the IWGP Heavyweight Championship belt to be awarded to him for winning the G1 instead of the typical briefcase and contract for a IWGP World Heavyweight Championship match at Wrestle Kingdom 16. On October 25 at Road to Power Struggle, Okada's request was approved and he appeared with the championship; despite holding the championship belt, Okada was not recognized as the official IWGP Heavyweight Champion and the belt is still considered deactivated.

Reigns

There were seventy three reigns shared among thirty-one wrestlers with ten vacancies. Title changes happen at NJPW-promoted events. Big Van Vader, Salman Hashimikov, Scott Norton, Bob Sapp, Brock Lesnar, A.J. Styles, Kenny Omega and Jay White were the eight non-Japanese wrestlers (billed as gaijin) to have held the title, with Vader being the first American champion, Hashimikov being the only Soviet-born champion, Omega is the only Canadian champion and White the only New Zealand champion. Antonio Inoki was the first champion in the title's history. Hiroshi Tanahashi held the record for most reigns with eight. Kazuchika Okada held the record for the longest reign in the title's history at 720 days during his fourth reign, over which he successfully defended the title 12 times, more defenses than any other title holder. Kensuke Sasaki's fourth reign of 16 days is the shortest in the title's history. Over his five reigns, Okada successfully defended the title 30 times, the most of any champion. Big Van Vader's first and third reigns, Salman Hashimikov's only reign, Riki Choshu's first reign, Tatsumi Fujinami's third and fifth reigns, Masahiro Chono's only reign, Genichiro Tenryu's only reign, Scott Norton's second reign, Hiroyoshi Tenzan's first and third reigns, Kensuke Sasaki's fourth reign, Kazuyuki Fujita's third reign, Manabu Nakanishi's only reign, Hiroshi Tanahashi's eighth reign, and Jay White's only reign are all tied for least successful defenses at zero.

Combined reigns

See also
G1 Climax
New Japan Cup
IWGP Heavyweight Championship (original version)

References
General
 

Specific

External links
New Japan Pro-Wrestling official website

New Japan Pro-Wrestling championships
World heavyweight wrestling championships